Achorella is a genus of fungi in the class Dothideomycetes. The relationship of this taxon to other taxa within the class is unknown (incertae sedis). Also, the placement of this genus within the Dothideomycetes is uncertain.

Species
Achorella ametableta
Achorella andina
Achorella attaleae
Achorella centrolobii
Achorella costaricensis
Achorella gastrolobii
Achorella guianensis
Achorella juruana
Achorella plectroniae
Achorella saginata
Achorella toroana
Achorella vaccinii

See also 
 List of Dothideomycetes genera incertae sedis

References

External links 
 Index Fungorum

Dothideomycetes enigmatic taxa
Dothideomycetes genera